Violet Township is one of the thirteen townships of Fairfield County, Ohio, United States. As of the 2010 census the population was 38,572, up from 26,914 people at the 2000 census. 18,994 of the township's residents lived in the unincorporated portions of the township in 2010.

Geography
Located in the northwestern corner of the county, it borders the following townships:
Etna Township, Licking County - north
Liberty Township - east
Greenfield Township - southeast corner
Bloom Township - south
Madison Township, Franklin County - southwest
Truro Township, Franklin County - northwest

Several municipalities are partially located in Violet Township:
The village of Canal Winchester, in the southwest
The village of Lithopolis, in the southwest
The city of Columbus, the capital of Ohio, in the northwest
The city of Pickerington, in the west
The city of Reynoldsburg, in the far northwest

Name and history
Violet Township was organized in 1808, and named for the patches of violets within its borders. It is the only Violet Township statewide.

Government
The township is governed by a three-member board of trustees, who are elected in November of odd-numbered years to a four-year term beginning on the following January 1. Two are elected in the year after the presidential election and one is elected in the year before it. There is also an elected township fiscal officer, who serves a four-year term beginning on April 1 of the year after the election, which is held in November of the year before the presidential election. Vacancies in the fiscal officership or on the board of trustees are filled by the remaining trustees.

Violet Township currently does not have its own police agency and as such utilizes the Fairfield County Sheriffs Office, which provides two deputies at a time to service the area. Pickerington Police will also frequently assist deputies in policing the agency when call volume is high and resources are available.

The fire department services the unincorporated township, the City of Pickerington and parts of the City of Columbus and City of Reynoldsburg.

References

External links
Township website
County website
Township Economic Development Website

Townships in Fairfield County, Ohio
Townships in Ohio